Frederica Darema is a Greek American physicist. She proposed the SPMD programming model in 1984 and Dynamic Data Driven Application Systems (DDDAS) in 2000. She was elected IEEE Fellow in 2004.

Biography
Darema received her BS degree from the School of Physics and Mathematics of the University of Athens - Greece, and MS and Ph. D. degrees in Theoretical Nuclear Physics from the Illinois Institute of Technology and the University of California at Davis, respectively, where she attended as a Fulbright Scholar and a Distinguished Scholar. After Physics Research Associate positions at the University of Pittsburgh and Brookhaven National Laboratory, she received an APS Industrial Fellowship and became a Technical Staff Member in the Nuclear Sciences Department at Schlumberger Doll Research. Subsequently, in 1982, she joined the IBM Thomas J. Watson Research Center as a Research Staff Member in the Computer Sciences Department and later-on she established and became the manager of a research group at IBM Research on parallel applications. Dr. Darema has been at the National Science Foundation since 1994, where she has managed the New Generation Software and Dynamic Data Driven Application Systems programs. During 1996-1998 she completed a two-year assignment at DARPA. She is now at the Air Force Office of Scientific Research.

References

External links
Frederica Darema, Dynamic Data Driven Application Systems, LCPC 2003: The 16th International Workshop on Languages and Compilers for Parallel Computing 
AFOSR: Mathematics, Information and Life Sciences. Retrieved April 22, 2010.

American computer scientists
Programming language researchers
Illinois Institute of Technology alumni
University of California, Davis alumni
American women computer scientists
Living people
Year of birth missing (living people)
Fellow Members of the IEEE
21st-century American women